Mads Hoxer Hangaard (born 6 December 2000) is a Danish handball player for Aalborg Håndbold and the Danish national team.

He participated in 2018 European Men's U-18 Handball Championship and won a bronze medal. He also participated in 2019 Men's Youth World Handball Championship, once again winning a bronze medal with Denmark. With Mors-Thy Håndbold he won the 2020 Danish Men's Handball Cup, and was chosen as the MVP of the final four event.

References

2000 births
Living people
Danish male handball players
Aalborg Håndbold players